Eijirō, Eijiro or Eijirou (written: 英治郎, 英次郎 or 英二郎) is a masculine Japanese given name. Notable people with the name include:

, Japanese artist
, Japanese footballer
, Japanese actor
, Japanese footballer
, Japanese actor

Fictional characters
 a character in the manga series My Hero Academia

Japanese masculine given names